Acianthera quisqueyana is a species of orchid plant native to the Dominican Republic.

References 

quisqueyana
Flora of the Dominican Republic
Flora without expected TNC conservation status